Plough Inn is located in Madison, Wisconsin.

History
The house was originally built as a residence for Frederick and Amelia Puanack, both German immigrants. John and Isabella Whare later turned it into a roadhouse. During the American Civil War, it was a popular destination for soldiers stationed at Camp Randall. Currently, it is used as a bed and breakfast called 'Arbor House'. It was listed on the National Register of Historic Places in 1980 and the State Register of Historic Places in 1989.

References

Hotel buildings on the National Register of Historic Places in Wisconsin
Houses on the National Register of Historic Places in Wisconsin
National Register of Historic Places in Madison, Wisconsin
Bed and breakfasts in Wisconsin
Houses in Madison, Wisconsin
Greek Revival architecture in Wisconsin
Houses completed in 1853